The R491 is a regional road in Ireland linking Nenagh, County Tipperary via Cloughjordan and Shinrone to Roscrea, County Tipperary.

See also
 Roads in Ireland - (Primary National Roads)
 Secondary Roads

References

Regional roads in the Republic of Ireland
Roads in County Tipperary
Roads in County Offaly